Kessleria brachypterella is a moth of the family Yponomeutidae. It is found in France and Spain.

The length of the forewings is 7-7.3 mm for males and 5.6–6 mm for females. The forewings are brownish grey with whitish scales. The hindwings are greyish brown. Adults have been recorded in August.

References

Moths described in 1992
Yponomeutidae
Moths of Europe